The 1981–82 Utah Jazz season was the team's eighth in the NBA. They began the season hoping to improve upon their 28–54 output from the previous season. They came up three wins shy of tying it, finishing 25–57, and failed to qualify for the playoffs for the eighth straight season.

Draft picks

Roster

Regular season

Season standings

z - clinched division title
y - clinched division title
x - clinched playoff spot

Record vs. opponents

Game log

Player statistics

Awards and records

Transactions

References

Utah Jazz seasons
U
Utah Jazz
Utah Jazz